Geitsjøen is a lake in the municipality of Nore og Uvdal in Viken county, Norway. It lies east of the Hardangervidda mountain plateau, at the lower end of the catchment area of the river Djupa in the Numedalslågen watershed.

See also
List of lakes in Norway

References

External links
Der Geitsjøen i  Nore og Uvdal 

Lakes of Viken (county)
Nore og Uvdal